Pieter Aldrich and Danie Visser were the defending champions, but Aldrich did not compete this year. Visser teamed up with Neil Broad and lost in semifinals to Jan Siemerink and Daniel Vacek.

Petr Korda and Karel Nováček won the title by defeating Jan Siemerink and Daniel Vacek 3–6, 7–5, 7–5 in the final.

Seeds

Draw

Draw

References

External links
 Official results archive (ATP)
 Official results archive (ITF)

Singles